Dyanfres Douglas Chagas Matos (born December 30, 1987), or simply Douglas, is a Brazilian footballer who plays for Kashiwa Reysol, as a striker.

Career
Douglas signed for Tokushima Vortis in July 2010. He made his J2 League debut on 25 July 2010 against Tokyo Verdy. He scored his first goal for the club on 22 August 2010 against Giravanz Kitakyushu. In 2015, he was loaned to J1 League side Sanfrecce Hiroshima. He was named in the 2015 J.League Best XI.  In 2016, Douglas moved to UAE and signed for Al Ain FC. In November 25, he missed a penalty which effect Al Ain and make them lost the champions league final.

Club statistics
Updated to 3 November 2021.

1Includes J1 Promotion Playoffs, J. League Championship, Japanese Super Cup, and FIFA World Cup.

Honours

Club
Sanfrecce Hiroshima
J1 League: 2015

Al Ain
UAE Pro League: 2017–18
UAE President's Cup: 2017–18

Vissel Kobe
Japanese Super Cup: 2020

Individual
Fans' Asian Champions League XI: 2016
J.League Best XI: 2015

References

External links
Profile at Vissel Kobe

1987 births
Living people
Brazilian footballers
Brazilian expatriate footballers
J1 League players
J2 League players
Tokushima Vortis players
Kyoto Sanga FC players
Sanfrecce Hiroshima players
Shimizu S-Pulse players
Vissel Kobe players
Kashiwa Reysol players
Al Ain FC players
Figueirense FC players
Brazilian expatriate sportspeople in Japan
Brazilian expatriate sportspeople in the United Arab Emirates
Expatriate footballers in Japan
Expatriate footballers in the United Arab Emirates
Association football forwards
UAE Pro League players